Ghotki rail crash may refer to:

1991 Ghotki train crash
2005 Ghotki rail crash
2021 Ghotki rail crash